The Irish Poor Law Extension Acts were a set of 1847 Acts of the Parliament of the United Kingdom which altered the Irish Poor Law system. The passing of the Acts meant that the full cost of the Irish Poor Law system fell upon Irish property owners.

The legislation consisted of three separate acts, the main one being 'An Act to make further Provision for the Relief of the destitute Poor in Ireland' (8 June 1847), 10 Vic., c.31.

See also
Irish Poor Law
Christine Kinealy, 'This Great Calamity. The Great Irish Famine, 1845-52', Dublin: Gill and Macmillan, 1994 and 2006.

References

Irish Poor Laws
United Kingdom Acts of Parliament 1847
1847 in Ireland
Acts of the Parliament of the United Kingdom concerning Ireland